Duncan William McNair,  KHS is a commercial and corporate litigation lawyer, author and charity campaigner, the youngest of seven children of Squadron Leader (and Acting Wing Commander) Robin McNair, DFC and Bar, and his wife, Estelle (née Townsend), who was a great-niece of Surgeon-General Sir Edmond Townsend KCB CMG.

Life and career
McNair was educated as a State Scholar at St Benedict's School, Ealing and at the University of Bristol, where he was Vice-President of the University Debating Union. He has practised City oriented litigation at Lovells (now Hogan Lovells), at Lawrence Graham LLP, and, since 2019, at Spencer West LLP, specialising in major commercial and corporate litigation and public law cases, domestically and internationally, and contested wills and probate cases involving substantial estates.

Protection of Life During Pregnancy Bill
In 2011 McNair acted for the successful third party interveners in A, B & C –v- Republic of Ireland, before the Grand Chamber of the European Court of Human Rights (ECHR). This was a landmark case in which the court dismissed a wide range of complaints by A, B and C, who had claimed lack of access to abortion facilities in Ireland. In light of the ABC case, the Irish Government introduced the Protection of Life During Pregnancy Bill to detail the circumstances under which abortions in Ireland could be legally performed. This passed into law in July 2013.

Other notable cases
In 2012 he acted for successful interveners in BPAS –v- Secretary of State for Health, in the Administrative Court in London.

He was named respectively both "Lawyer in the News" (Law Society Gazette) and "Lawyer of the Week" (The Times) for his successful conduct of these cases.

In 2015 he led a large team of lawyers in an international abuse of dominant position action against Rolls-Royce.

The McNair Inquiry and Report

In 2012 McNair was appointed by the RSPCA to chair a national review of its Freedom Food scheme. Serving on his panel were former Cabinet minister and Secretary of State at DEFRA, the Rt Hon (now Dame) Caroline Spelman (MP), and Prof. David Main (BVetMed, PhD, MRCVS), Reader in Animal Welfare and Behaviour at the University of Bristol Veterinary School. Evidence was taken from all areas of animal food production, distribution and retail and from numerous interested parties. The McNair Report was presented in May 2013. Its recommendations were unanimously approved by the Council of Trustees of the RSPCA the following month. The RSPCA later announced it was formulating a strategy to build on the recommendations of the McNair Report  which formed the basis of their RSPCA Assured scheme. The scheme is dedicated to the better welfare of hundreds of millions of farmed animals across the UK and is influential upon schemes affecting many billion farmed animals across the world.

Charity work 
McNair undertakes extensive pro bono charity work, especially in the field of local communities and animal welfare. In 2015 he founded Save The Asian Elephants ("STAE"), a coalition of politicians, academics, lawyers, field experts and campaigners working to protect the Asian elephant from abuse and extinction (www.stae.org).  He has addressed many influential audiences on the issues arising and solutions formulated by STAE in liaison with specialists in India, the UK and worldwide.

He also speaks and publishes widely on issues relating to animal welfare in the context of food production, distribution and retail and problems associated with livestock supply chains.

McNair is active in various initiatives to help local communities and schools.

Attributions 
McNair is described in his legal profession work as "indefatigable" and is named as "the client's champion" in the 2015 edition of Legal 500, a leading client and peer review of recommended UK lawyers.

Honours and awards
Duncan McNair was appointed a Knight of the Holy Sepulchre (KHS) by the Roman Catholic Church in 2002. 

McNair was named Winner of the "Animal Hero of the Year" competition at the Animal Star Awards 2018, an event attracting 850 nominations across the UK.

Books
McNair has written two books, The Morello Letters – Pen pal to the stars and More Morello Letters – Pen pal to the superstars under the pseudonym of a fictional Italian immigrant, "Mrs Morello, a lover of all things British", who struggles to understand some of the more idiosyncratic aspects of British life. Both books have been widely reviewed and acclaimed. In 2012 The Morello Letters was included by BBC Radio 4 listeners amongst their funniest books ever in Open Book’s Listeners’ Funniest Books hosted by Mariella Frostrup.

References

External links
Morelloworld, book website
RSPCA announces review of Freedom Food Scheme
The McNair Report
RSPCA Freedom Food farmed animal welfare assurance scheme

Living people
English lawyers
English non-fiction writers
English humorists
Alumni of the University of Bristol
People educated at St Benedict's School, Ealing
English Roman Catholics
English male non-fiction writers
Knights of the Holy Sepulchre
Year of birth missing (living people)
People associated with Hogan Lovells